Drunella coloradensis is a species of spiny crawler mayfly in the family Ephemerellidae. It is found in Central America, North America. In North America its range includes southwestern, northern Canada, northern Mexico, the western United States, and Alaska.

References

External links

 

Mayflies
Articles created by Qbugbot
Insects described in 1923